Michael Paul Rock (born 13 March 1987) is a British butterfly stroke swimmer. He attended St. Edward's College, Liverpool, from 1998 to 2003.

As of 2008 he is a student at The University of Manchester, and is studying law.

Swimming career
Rock competed in the 100 m and 200 m butterfly events at the 2008 Summer Olympics in Beijing, China, after becoming British champion in both events at the 2008 British Olympic Swimming Trials in Sheffield.

At the 2010 Commonwealth Games in Delhi, India, competed in the 100 and 200m butterfly events, where he won silver at 200m. 
 Long course (50 m)

 Short course (25 m)

External links
British Swimming athlete profile
Olympic Profile

References

1987 births
Living people
English male swimmers
Male butterfly swimmers
Olympic swimmers of Great Britain
Swimmers at the 2008 Summer Olympics
Swimmers at the 2012 Summer Olympics
Commonwealth Games silver medallists for England
Commonwealth Games medallists in swimming
Swimmers at the 2010 Commonwealth Games
Sportspeople from Liverpool
Alumni of the University of Manchester
Medallists at the 2010 Commonwealth Games